Scutpelecopsis is a genus of sheet weavers that was first described by Y. M. Marusik & V. A. Gnelitsa in 2009.

Species
 it contains five species:
Scutpelecopsis krausi (Wunderlich, 1980) – SE Europe (Balkans) to Armenia
Scutpelecopsis loricata Duma & Tanasevitch, 2011 – Romania
Scutpelecopsis media Wunderlich, 2011 – Turkey
Scutpelecopsis procer Wunderlich, 2011 – Iran
Scutpelecopsis wunderlichi Marusik & Gnelitsa, 2009 (type) – Georgia

See also
 List of Linyphiidae species (Q–Z)

References

Araneomorphae genera
Linyphiidae
Spiders of Asia